Basketball (Spanish:Baloncesto), for the 2013 Bolivarian Games, took place from 17 November to 29 November 2013.

Participating teams
  (men's and women's teams)
  (women's team only)
  (women's team only)
  (women's team only)
  (men's and women's teams)
  (men's and women's teams)

Medal table
Key:

Medal summary

References

Events at the 2013 Bolivarian Games
2013–14 in South American basketball
Basketball at multi-sport events
International basketball competitions hosted by Peru